Orthoceras  is a  genus of orchids native to Australia, New Zealand and New Caledonia. Two species are known:

Orthoceras novae-zeelandiae (A.Rich.) M.A.Clem., D.L.Jones & Molloy - New Zealand
Orthoceras strictum R.Br. - New South Wales, Queensland, South Australia, Tasmania, Victoria, New Zealand North Island, New Caledonia

See also 
 List of Orchidaceae genera

References 

Berg Pana, H. 2005. Handbuch der Orchideen-Namen. Dictionary of Orchid Names. Dizionario dei nomi delle orchidee. Ulmer, Stuttgart

External links 
 
 

Diuridinae
Diurideae genera